Harmony Garden may refer to;

 Harmony Garden, Hong Kong, a public housing estate in Siu Sai Wan, Hong Kong
 Harmony Garden, Scottish Borders